Terra Hazelton is a Canadian jazz musician, broadcaster and actress.

Raised in Calgary, Hazelton began studying theatre with the Loose Moose Theatre Company as a teenager. She later moved to Toronto to pursue opportunities in theatre, discovering her skills as a musician when she was asked to write a comedic song for an improv show. She has since released two solo albums as a jazz singer, as well as appearing on Jeff Healey's 2006 album It's Tight Like That. She performs regularly at Toronto jazz clubs and has performed at various jazz festivals across Canada, and also formerly hosted Timeless, a program on Toronto's jazz radio station CJRT-FM devoted to early 20th century jazz recordings.

As an actor, she made her first film appearance in the 2010 film FUBAR 2. She garnered a Genie Award nomination for Best Supporting Actress at the 31st Genie Awards.

Discography
 Anybody's Baby (HealeyOphonic, 2004)
 Gimme Whatcha Got (2009)

Filmography
Anybody's Baby, 2008
Fubar II, 2010
Paranormal Witness, 2013
Orphan Black, 2014
Whatever, Linda, 2014

References

External links
Terra Hazelton

Canadian women jazz singers
Canadian radio personalities
Canadian film actresses
Living people
Year of birth missing (living people)
Jazz radio presenters
Actresses from Calgary
Musicians from Calgary
21st-century Canadian actresses
21st-century Canadian women singers
Canadian women radio presenters